Evolis is a French company, which develops, manufactures, and sell printers and software for personalized and decentralized printing of  plastic cards. Their headquarters and the production facility are located near Angers, France.

Overview 
Evolis was founded in 1999 by Emmanuel Picot, the current CEO, Cécile Belanger, the current Vice-President, Didier Godard, Yves Liatard and Serge Olivier. All worked previously for a US manufacturer of plastic card printers with operations in France. and AIC is the official distributor in Egypt.

In 2005 the company opened a subsidiary in Fort Lauderdale, Florida and in 2006, in Singapore. . Evolis became publicly traded at the Alternext Paris stock exchange, in 2006.

In 2009, the firm opened a sales office in Shanghai, China. In 2012, it acquired Sogedex Accessories based in Trappes, France. The next year, it acquired 70% of the Indian company Rajpurohit Cardtec which became a subsidiary under the name of Evolis India.

During 2014 the firm acquired of Detraplast and integrated it into the production facilities in Beaucouzé. The same year, the firm turned its sales office in Shanghai into a subsidiary called Evolis China.

In 2016, Evolis announced the acquisition of a majority stake in CardPresso, a card design software company. The same year, Evolis announced it had completed installation of 50,000 systems in banks worldwide. In November 2016 the company was awarded a US$1.2 million contract with the Social Security department of Shandong, China to produce combination debit and social security cards. The hardware for the project is planned to be manufactured in Beaucouzé, and deployed some time in December.
In 2016, Evolis becomes « the global leader for the decentralized issuance of payment cards with more than 50,000 systems deployed in bank branches all over the world ». 

In 2017, Evolis opens a sales office in Tokyo, Japan. The American subsidiary is reorganized with the opening of a sales office in Providence to serve the US and Canadian markets. The teams based in Fort Lauderdale are dedicated to the Latin American market. The same year, Evolis acquires the remaining shares (30 %) of Evolis India and restructures this subsidiary in order to accelerate the group's business development in India. 

In January 2019, the sales office in Tokyo becomes a wholly owned subsidiary: Evolis Japan.

Portfolio 
Evolis' provides:
 Card printers
 Software
 Business solutions (Edikio Price Tag and Edikio Guest offers)
 Signature pads  
 ID accessories
 Services.

Previous clients have included the French supermarket Intermarché, the RATP public transit service in Paris, voting cards for Tanzania, health insurance cards for Poland, and accreditation badges for the Cannes Film Festival.

As of December 2018, the company had sold 540,000 printers in 140 countries.

Subsidiaries 
Evolis owns 8 subsidiaries:

 Evolis Inc., in Fort Lauderdale, Florida, and Providence, United States
 Evolis Asia Pte. Ltd in Singapore 
 Evolis China in Shanghai, China
 Evolis India in Mumbai, India 
 Sogedex Accessoires in Paris, France
 CardPresso in Santo Isidoro, Portugal
 ACTS in Lyon, France
 Evolis Japan in Tokyo, Japan

References 

French companies established in 1999